Dell Rapids High School is a high school located in Dell Rapids, South Dakota. Their athletics teams are known as the Quarriers.

References

External links
 

Public high schools in South Dakota
Schools in Minnehaha County, South Dakota